The Last Hour is a 1923 American silent crime film directed by Edward Sloman and starring Milton Sills, Carmel Myers and Pat O'Malley.

Cast
 Milton Sills as Steve Cline
 Carmel Myers as Saidee McCall
 Pat O'Malley as Philip Logan
 Jack Mower as 	Tom Cline
 Alec B. Francis as 	Reever McCall 
 Charles Clary as 	William Mallory
 Walter Long as Red Brown
 Eric Mayne as 	Gov. Logan
 Clarence Wilson as Quales
 Gary Cooper as 	Extra

References

Bibliography
 Connelly, Robert B. The Silents: Silent Feature Films, 1910-36, Volume 40, Issue 2. December Press, 1998.
 Munden, Kenneth White. The American Film Institute Catalog of Motion Pictures Produced in the United States, Part 1. University of California Press, 1997.

External links
 

1923 films
1923 crime films
American silent feature films
American crime films
Films directed by Edward Sloman
American black-and-white films
1920s English-language films
1920s American films